Lord Lisle may refer to any man who held the title:
 Baron Lisle
 Viscount Lisle
 Philip Sidney, 3rd Earl of Leicester, played a major role in the Wars of the Three Kingdoms including time as  Lord Lieutenant and Commander-in-Chief of Ireland from 1646 to 1647 under the courtesy title Lord Lisle

See also
 Viscount De L'Isle